Ukraine is scheduled to compete at the 2017 World Aquatics Championships in Budapest, Hungary from 14 July to 30 July.

Medalists

Diving

Ukraine has entered 12 divers (five male and seven female).

Men

Women

Mixed

High diving

Ukraine qualified one male high diver.

Open water swimming

Ukraine has entered four open water swimmers

Swimming

Ukrainian swimmers have achieved qualifying standards in the following events (up to a maximum of 2 swimmers in each event at the A-standard entry time, and 1 at the B-standard):

Men

Women

Synchronized swimming

Ukraine's synchronized swimming team consisted of 12 athletes (12 female).

Women

 Legend: (R) = Reserve Athlete

References

Nations at the 2017 World Aquatics Championships
Ukraine at the World Aquatics Championships
2017 in Ukrainian sport